Nicola Willoughby (born 1981) is an English model from Lincolnshire. In 1999 she was chosen  Miss United Kingdom and competed for Miss World. She was considered a favourite for the Miss World title, until it emerged that she had posed for topless photos,  several of which were published in a London tabloid. Ultimately she was allowed to compete, but her chances of winning had been ruined.

References

1981 births
Living people
English female models
Miss World 1999 delegates
Miss United Kingdom winners
20th-century English women
20th-century English people